Mercedes College may refer to:
Mercedes College (Adelaide)
Mercedes College, Perth